The women's singles tournament at the 2007 ECM Prague Open took place between 7 and 13 May on clay courts in Prague, Czech Republic. Akiko Morigami won the title, defeating Marion Bartoli in the final.

Seeds

Draw

Finals

Top half

Bottom half

External Links
 Main Draw

2007 Singles
ECM Prague Open - Singles
2007 in Czech women's sport